Karim Alami (born 24 May 1973) is a retired tennis player from Morocco, who turned professional in 1990.

The right-hander won two career titles in singles, both in 1996 (Atlanta and Palermo), and reached a career-high ATP singles ranking of world No. 25, in February 2000. Alami reached the semifinals of the 2000 Monte Carlo Masters, defeating Magnus Norman and Albert Costa en route.

Tennis career
Alami represented his native country as a qualifier at the 1992 Summer Olympics in Barcelona, where he was defeated in the first round by Switzerland's eventual winner Marc Rosset. He also reached the quarterfinals of the 2000 Summer Olympics in Sydney.

He defeated Pete Sampras in the first round of the 1994 Doha tournament, a year in which Sampras dominated the tour. He is now the Tournament Director of the Qatar ExxonMobil Open in Doha. He also works as a tennis commentator for the most popular Arabic sports channel beIN Sports.

As well as his semifinal run at the 2000 Monte-Carlo Masters, Alami reached the quarterfinals of the 1997 Rome Masters.

Junior Grand Slam finals

Singles: 1 (1 runner-up)

Doubles: 2 (2 titles)

ATP career finals

Singles: 6 (2 titles, 4 runner-ups)

Doubles: 4 (1 title, 3 runner-ups)

ATP Challenger and ITF Futures finals

Singles: 12 (3–9)

Doubles: 2 (1–1)

Performance timeline

Singles

References

External links
 
 
 

1973 births
Living people
Moroccan male tennis players
Olympic tennis players of Morocco
Sportspeople from Casablanca
Tennis players at the 1992 Summer Olympics
Tennis players at the 2000 Summer Olympics
US Open (tennis) junior champions
Wimbledon junior champions
Grand Slam (tennis) champions in boys' doubles